Middleton, County Durham, may refer to several places in County Durham, England:

 Middleton, Hartlepool, a town in Hartlepool
 Middleton-in-Teesdale, a small market town situated on the north side of Teesdale
 Middleton One Row, a village in the borough of Darlington
 Middleton St George, a village in the borough of Darlington